Waleran I of Luxembourg (died 5 June 1288 in the Battle of Worringen) was Lord of Ligny and La Roche around 1281.

He was the second son of Henry V, Count of Luxembourg and Margaret of Bar. While is older brother Henry VI became Count of Luxembourg like their father, Waleran I is the forefather and founder of what became the french branch of the House of Luxembourg, the so-called house of Luxembourg-Ligny.

He married Jeanne, Dame de Beaurevoir (died before December 1300), and had:
 Henry II, died 1303, 1295 Lord of Ligny
 Waleran II (1275–1354) Lord of Ligny, Roussy and Beauvoir, married Guyotte Châtelaine de Lille († 1338)
 Philipotte
 Elisabeth
 Marguerite, nun
 Marie (died 1337), married Jean de Ghistelles (killed in 1346 in the Battle of Crécy)

He was killed together with his brother Henry VI, Count of Luxembourg in the Battle of Worringen against John I, Duke of Brabant. His eldest son, Henry II of Ligny, succeeded him.

Waleran of Luxembourg is one of the protagonists in Le Tournoi de Chauvency by trouvère Jacques Bretel.

Sources 

1288 deaths
13th-century French people
Counts of Ligny
French people of Luxembourgian descent
Year of birth unknown